Young Mac of Fort Vancouver is a children's historical novel by Mary Jane Carr. Set in 1832, it recounts the adventures of Donald McDermott, a young mixed-blood fur trader. The novel, illustrated by Richard Holberg, was first published in 1940 and was a Newbery Honor recipient in 1941.

References

1940 American novels
Children's historical novels
American children's novels
Newbery Honor-winning works
Novels set in Washington (state)
Fiction set in 1832
Novels set in the 1830s
1940 children's books